David Meul (born 3 July 1981) is a retired Belgian professional footballer who played as a goalkeeper. He played for Beveren, Racing Mechelen, Hamme, Xanthi, Fortuna Sittard, SC Cambuur and Willem II.

Honours

Club
Willem II
Eerste Divisie (1): 2013–14

External links
 
 Voetbal International profile 

1981 births
Living people
People from Beveren
Association football goalkeepers
Belgian footballers
Belgian expatriate footballers
K.S.K. Beveren players
K.R.C. Mechelen players
Xanthi F.C. players
Willem II (football club) players
Fortuna Sittard players
SC Cambuur players
Belgian Pro League players
Challenger Pro League players
Eredivisie players
Eerste Divisie players
Expatriate footballers in Greece
Expatriate footballers in the Netherlands
Footballers from East Flanders